Barekese is a town and capital of the Atwima Nwabiagya District within Ashanti Region, Ghana. It is home to the Barekese Dam and Barekese Senior High School.

References

Populated places in the Ashanti Region